Karine is a feminine French given name. Notable people with the name include:

Karine Bakhoum, Egyptian American chef
Karine Baste (born 1982), French journalist and news presenter
Karine Beauchard (born 1978), French mathematician
Karine Berger (born 1973), French politician
Karine Ferri (born 1982), French television presenter and model
Karine Giboulo (born 1980), Canadian artist
Karine Costa (born 1977), French singer
Karine Haaland (born 1966), Norwegian comic strip creator
Karine Icher (born 1979), French professional golfer
Karine Laurent Philippot (born 1974), French cross country skier
Karine Lebon (born 1985), French politician
Karine Legault (born 1978), retired Canadian female freestyle swimmer
Karine Polwart (born 1971), Scottish singer-songwriter
Karine Ruby (1978–2009), French snowboarder and Olympic champion
Karine Saporta (born 1950), French choreographer, dancer, photographer, and short film director
Karine Sergerie (born 1985), the 2007 world champion in women's 67 kg Taekwondo
Karine Turcotte (born 1978), Canadian weightlifter
Karine Vanasse (born 1983), French Canadian actress

See also

Karien
Karine A, Palestinian freighter seized in the Red Sea
Karinë, municipality in the Peqin District, Elbasan County in central Albania
Karline

French feminine given names